Coleophora plurifoliella is a moth of the family Coleophoridae. It is found in Algeria, Tunisia and the Palestinian Territories.

The larvae feed on Atriplex halimus. They feed on the leaves of their host plant.

References

plurifoliella
Moths of Africa
Moths of the Middle East
Moths described in 1896